Agente S 03: Operazione Atlantide or Operation Atlantis is a 1965 Italian spy film adventure directed by Domenico Paolella.

Italian film critic Marco Giusti refers to the film as "craziness" and describes it as a mixture of peplum, science fiction and Eurospy.

Cast

John Ericson ...  George Steele
Bernardina Sarrocco ...  Albia (as Berna Rock)
Cristina Gaioni  (as Cristina Gajoni)
María Granada ...  Fatma
Carlo Hinterman ...  Prof. Reich
Beni Deus ...  Ben Ullah
José Manuel Martín ...  Nailawi
Erika Blanc ...  Kate
Dario Michaelis
Dario De Grassi
Luigi Tosi
Mino Doro
Franco Ressel
Tullio Altamura
Tina Conte
Renato Terra

References

External links 
 
Operation Atlantis on MyMovies.it

1965 films
1960s Italian-language films
1960s spy thriller films
Italian spy thriller films
Films directed by Domenico Paolella
Films shot in Almería
1960s Italian films